The 43rd Field Artillery Battalion was a field artillery battalion of the Regular Army

History

Lineage
Constituted 1 October 1933 in the Regular Army as the 43rd Field Artillery
Redesignated 13 January 1941 as the 43rd Field Artillery Battalion.
Assigned to the 8th Infantry Division (United States) and activated at Fort Jackson, South Carolina 1 June 1941
Inactivated 20 October 1945 at Fort Leonard Wood, Missouri.
(1st Battalion, 43rd Coast Artillery reconstituted and consolidated with the 43rd Field Artillery Battalion 28 June 1950)
Activated 17 August 1950 at Fort Jackson, South Carolina
Relieved from the 8th Infantry Division and inactivated in Germany 1 August 1957
Consolidated with 43rd Artillery 1 March 1959.

Campaign streamers
World War I

World War II
 Normandy
 Northern France
 Rhineland
 Central Europe

Decorations
 Luxembourg Croix de Guerre, Streamer embroidered LUXEMBOURG

Current units
not active

Coat of arms
 Shield
Gules, a 105mm shell or surmounted by a compass rose argent and sable
 Crest
none
 Background
in the predominating scarlet and gold of the field artillery arm the functions of the organization are symbolized by the 105mm shell. The compass represents the far reaching effect of the fire of the organization and represents willingness to carry on to all points of the compass.

See also
 Field Artillery Branch (United States)
 U.S. Army Regimental System
 List of field artillery regiments of the United States

References

 Encyclopedia of United States Army insignia and uniforms By William K. Emerson (page 51).

043
Military units and formations established in 1933